Comox Lake is a glacier fed freshwater lake located in mid-Vancouver Island, British Columbia, Canada. It is located northwest of the smaller Beaufort Lake in the Comox Valley near Cumberland, British Columbia, and about 10km southwest of Courtenay.  The lake is a reservoir for drinking water and for hydroelectric power.

Comox lake is well known for its surrounding hiking and bike trails.

See also
Forbush Lake

References

External links
About Comox Valley
Vancouver Island

Comox
Nelson Land District